Road traffic accidents in Ethiopia are a major problem with various aspects of causes and lack of management and policy on road safety. Traffic accidents are increasing over time while there is no structural national government policy involving infrastructural, and legal issues. Even though the government regulated draft strategies to improve traffic efficiency and reduce road traffic accidents, major problems are escalated by pedestrians as well as drivers. Drivers' bad behavior including aggressiveness and actions are the main contributor of traffic accident in Ethiopia.
 
In 2021, the Federal Police Commission recorded 15,034 road accidents during fiscal year starting from 7 July 2021, leaving 4,161 people dead. The World Health Organization (WHO) in 2013 reported that Ethiopia recorded the highest road traffic accident, estimated about 4,984.3 deaths per 100,000 vehicles per year.

Prevalence 

In Ethiopia, road traffic accident is a serious problem that occurs periodically. The Analyzing Traffic Accident research suggested that there were more than 29,1577 accidents in the past eleven years, including 912,956 kilometers road network and 68,100 motorized vehicles were developed. From 2007/2008 years to 2017/2018 years, the variation of road network coverage in kilometer and motorized vehicle were estimated around 25,914 and 563,003 respectively.

According to the Amhara Region Police Commission, almost half of 51% of car accidents occurred by freight vehicles followed by passenger vehicles which constituted 34.5% of all accidents in the region. About half of 54.8% of accidents occurred on expressway. From April to June 2015, STEPS conducted surveys between the age of 15 and 69 using violence and injury questions by using WHO standard questionnaire. The respondents involved road traffic crash during the past 12 months, by sex, age, and place of residence as follows:

In 2021, the Federal Police Commission report issued that the country experienced 15,034 road accidents during the fiscal year that ended on 7 July 2021, leaving 4,161 people dead. The accidents left 5,763 injuries, while 5,110 others sustained minor injuries. Police also recorded 31,643 accidents that caused property damage worth more than 2.28 million birr. The World Health Organization (WHO) reported in 2013 that Ethiopia is amongst country to have the highest road accident, estimated about 4,984.3 deaths per 100,000 vehicles per year, compared to 574 across Sub-Saharan countries. In addition, the number of people who are victims of car crashes are about 30 times higher than of the United States.

As of 3 March 2021, the Federal Police Commission said some 1,848 people died from traffic accidents in Ethiopia during the first six months of the 2020–21 fiscal year starting from July 2020.

Causes 

Major causes of road traffic accident involve poor road network, lack of knowledge on road traffic safety, mixed traffic flow system, poor legislation and enforcement, poor conditions of vehicles and emergency medical services, and absence of traffic accident insurance law. There is no national policy on the prevention of road traffic accidents, however there are draft strategies on road safety. Behaviors (such as aggressiveness) and actions of drivers are becoming the main causes of traffic accident in Ethiopia. Drivers commit errors by not giving priority to pedestrians, speeding, failure to stay on the right side of the road, and failure to maintain the distance between vehicles.

A lack of education is also rarely underreported. In January 2018, retrospective research was conducted in Finote Selam traffic police office, and 255 records were taken from September 2009 to the date. The result showed that drivers' educational level played a crucial role in road traffic accidents such as people below 12th grade were the most contributor of fatal car accidents. Poor infrastructure and low traffic enforcement along with other factors enlisted as the major problem in Ethiopia. In Oromia Region, 14.5% of all accidents and 24% of fatalities, has high traffic movement next to Addis Ababa. Poor insurance law, emergency services, lack of safety knowledge in mixed traffic flow system and poor road network is other factors affecting the traffic. Although the country regulated road safety draft strategies, there is no national government policy in Ethiopia.

References 

Transport in Ethiopia
Road incident deaths in Ethiopia